In rhetoric, chiasmus or, less commonly, chiasm (Latin term from Greek , "crossing", from the Greek , , "to shape like the letter Χ"), is a "reversal of grammatical structures in successive phrases or clauses – but no repetition of words".

A similar device, antimetabole, also involves a reversal of grammatical structures in successive phrases or clauses in an A-B-B-A configuration, but unlike chiasmus, presents a repetition of words.

Examples
Chiasmus balances words or phrases with similar, though not identical, meanings:

"Dotes" and "strongly loves" share the same meaning and bracket, as do "doubts" and "suspects".

Additional examples of chiasmus:

For comparison, the following is considered antimetabole, in which the reversal in structure involves the same words:

Both chiasmus and antimetabole can be used to reinforce antithesis. In chiasmus, the clauses display inverted parallelism. Chiasmus was particularly popular in the literature of the ancient world, including Hebrew, Greek, Latin and Ancient K'iche' Maya, where it was used to articulate the balance of order within the text. Many long and complex chiasmi have been found in Shakespeare and the Greek and Hebrew texts of the Bible. It is also found throughout the Quran and the Book of Mormon.

Conceptual chiasmus 
Chiasmus can be used in the structure of entire passages to parallel concepts or ideas. This process, termed "conceptual chiasmus", uses a criss-crossing rhetorical structure to cause an overlapping of "intellectual space". Conceptual chiasmus utilizes specific linguistic choices, often metaphors, to create a connection between two differing disciplines. By employing a chiastic structure to a single presented concept, rhetors encourage one area of thought to consider an opposing area's perspective.

Effectiveness
Chiasmus derives its effectiveness from its symmetrical structure. The structural symmetry of the chiasmus imposes the impression upon the reader or listener that the entire argument has been accounted for. In other words, chiasmus creates only two sides of an argument or idea for the listener to consider, and then leads the listener to favor one side of the argument.

Thematic chiasmus
The Wilhelmus, the national anthem of the Netherlands, has a structure composed around a thematic chiasmus: the 15 stanzas of the text are symmetrical, in that verses one and 15 resemble one another in meaning, as do verses two and 14, three and 13, etc., until they converge in the eighth verse, the heart of the song. Written in the 16th century, the Wilhelmus originated in the nation's struggle to achieve independence. It tells of the Father of the Nation William of Orange who was stadholder in the Netherlands under the king of Spain. In the first person, as if quoting himself, William speaks to the Dutch people and tells about both the outer conflict –  the Dutch Revolt – as well as his own, inner struggle: on one hand, he tries to be faithful to the king of Spain, on the other hand he is above all faithful to his conscience: to serve God and the Dutch people. This is made apparent in the central 8th stanza: "Oh David, thou soughtest shelter from King Saul's tyranny. Even so I fled this welter". Here the comparison is made between the biblical David and William of Orange as merciful and just leaders who both serve under tyrannic kings. As the merciful David defeats the unjust Saul and is rewarded by God with the kingdom of Israel, so too, with the help of God, will William be rewarded a kingdom; being either or both the Netherlands, and the kingdom of God.

See also 

 Antanaclasis
 Antimetabole
 Arch form
 Chiastic structure
 Contrapposto
 Figure of speech
 Golden line (a Latin poetic line based on an abAB structure)
 Palindrome
 Rhetoric
 Russian reversal
 Silver line (a Latin poetic line based on an abBA structure)
 Spoonerism
 Synchysis (the reverse of the chiasmus)
 The Throne Verse
 Transpositional pun

References

Sources 
 Baldrick, Chris. 2008. Oxford Dictionary of Literary Terms. Oxford University Press. New York. 
 Corbett, Edward P. J. and Connors, Robert J. 1999. Style and Statement. Oxford University Press. New York, Oxford. 
 Forsyth, Mark. 2014. The Elements of Eloquence. Berkley Publishing Group/Penguin Publishing. New York.

External links 

 Chiasmus, Rhetorical Figures, by Gideon O. Burton (Professor of Rhetoric and Composition, BYU), at humanities.byu.edu/rhetoric
 Chiasmus Explained at LiteraryDevices

Figures of speech
Rhetorical techniques